The Romanian Olympic and Sports Committee (COSR) is responsible for Romania's participation in the Olympic Games.

History

The Romanian Olympic Committee was formed in 1914 in Bucharest. In 2004 it changed its name to Romanian Olympic and Sports Committee.

Presidents 
The following is a list of presidents of the Romanian Olympic and Sports Committee since its creation in 1914.

IOC Members
This is a list a IOC Members:

Executive committee
The committee of the COSR is represented by:
 President: Mihai Covaliu
 Vice Presidents: Octavian Morariu, Camelia Potec, Alexandru Dedu
 Secretary General: George Boroi
 Treasurer: Vasile Luga
 Members: Irina Deleanu, Sandu Pop, Cristinel Romanescu, Adrian Stoica, Gheorghe Visan, Alina Dumitru, Doina Melinte, Georgeta Damian, Viorica Susanu, Puiu Gaspar, Alexandru Hălăucă, Valentin Amato Zaharia

Member federations
The Romanian National Federations are the organizations that coordinate all aspects of their individual sports. They are responsible for training, competition and development of their sports. There are currently 28 Olympic Summer. and 4 Winter Sport Federations in Romania.

See also
Romania at the Olympics

References

External links 
 Official website

COR
Olympic
COR

Sports organizations established in 1914